Jerry G. Fossum (born July 18, 1943) is an American electrical engineer who is a Distinguished Professor Emeritus at the University of Florida College of Engineering.

Early life and education 
Fossum is a native of Phoenix, Arizona. He earned a Bachelor of Science, Master of Science, and PhD in electrical engineering from the University of Arizona.

Career 
Fossum worked for Sandia National Laboratories before joining the University of Florida faculty in 1978. In 1983, he was elected a fellow of the IEEE. Fossum received the J. J. Ebers Award in 2004. His scholarship focuses on the semiconductor device theory, modeling, and design.

References

Living people
1943 births
20th-century American engineers
Engineers from Arizona
People from Phoenix, Arizona
University of Arizona alumni
University of Florida faculty
American electrical engineers
Fellow Members of the IEEE
Sandia National Laboratories people